The 2018–19 season was Shrewsbury Town's 133rd year in existence and their fourth consecutive season in League One. The club also participated in the FA Cup, the EFL Cup and the EFL Trophy.

The season covers the period from 1 July 2018 to 30 June 2019.

Transfers

Transfers in

Transfers out

Loans in

Loans out

Pre-season

Friendlies
Shrewsbury Town announced their first pre-season matches on 4 June 2018, with away trips to local rivals AFC Telford United and Port Vale. A home friendly was subsequently arranged with Brentford. The club's pre-season schedule was completed with an away fixture at Bristol City, and matches against Kidderminster Harriers and Burnley to be played behind closed doors.

Competitions

League One

League table

Result summary

Results by round

Matches
On 21 June 2018, the League One fixtures for the forthcoming season were announced.

FA Cup

The first round draw was made live on BBC by Dennis Wise and Dion Dublin on 22 October. The draw for the second round was made live on BBC and BT by Mark Schwarzer and Glenn Murray on 12 November. The third round draw was made live on BBC by Ruud Gullit and Paul Ince from Stamford Bridge on 3 December 2018. The fourth round draw was made live on BBC by Robbie Keane and Carl Ikeme from Wolverhampton on 7 January 2019.

EFL Cup

On 15 June 2018, the draw for the first round was made in Vietnam.

EFL Trophy
On 13 July 2018, the initial group stage draw bar the U21 invited clubs was announced. The draw for the second round was made live on Talksport by Leon Britton and Steve Claridge on 16 November. On 8 December, the third round draw was drawn by Alan McInally and Matt Le Tissier on Soccer Saturday.

References

Shrewsbury Town
Shrewsbury Town F.C. seasons